Climbing German Championships are the annual national championships for competition climbing organised by German Alpine Club (Deutscher Alpenverein, DAV). The first championships was held in 1991.

Lead

Bouldering

Speed

Combined

References

External links 
 Alpenverein.de: Competition Calendar

Climbing competitions